Ask Church is a parish church of the Church of Norway in Askøy Municipality in Vestland county, Norway. It is located in the village of Ask, on the eastern coast of the island of Askøy. It is the church for the Ask parish which is part of the Vesthordland prosti (deanery) in the Diocese of Bjørgvin. The white, wooden church was built in a long church design in 1908 using plans drawn up by the architect Hartvig Sverdrup Eckhoff. The church seats about 275 people.

History
The earliest existing historical records of the church date back to the year 1320, but it was not new that year. The first church at Ask was likely a wooden church that was possibly built during the 12th century. The church was made an annex chapel to the Bergen Cathedral parish starting at the Reformation. Because of this, there was no resident priest at Ask, and residents had to go across the Byfjorden to the city of Bergen to get to the main church. The residents of Askøy petitioned the King for their own parish for many years and it was not until 1740 when a rich merchant named Henrik Schreuder offered to pay for a new church. Instead of building a new church at Ask, however, the new church was built in the village of Strusshamn, in a location that was more centrally located in the parish. In 1741, the new Strusshamn Church was built on the southern shore of the island and the old Ask Church was torn down.

Eventually, the new Ask Church was approved and it was built in 1908 using designs by the architect Hartvig Sverdrup Eckhoff. Torjus Tengesdal was the lead builder of the new church. The new church was consecrated on 8 October 1908 by the Bishop Johan Willoch Erichsen. After its completion, it was made a chapel under the Strusshamn Church parish. In 1954-1955, the church was renovated according to plans by Torgeir Alvsaker. In 1987, the church porch was enlarged.

Media gallery

See also
List of churches in Bjørgvin

References

Askøy
Churches in Vestland
Long churches in Norway
Wooden churches in Norway
12th-century establishments in Norway
18th-century disestablishments in Norway
1908 establishments in Norway
20th-century Church of Norway church buildings
Churches completed in 1908